Zagórzany may refer to the following places:
Zagórzany, Gorlice County in Lesser Poland Voivodeship (south Poland)
Zagórzany, Wieliczka County in Lesser Poland Voivodeship (south Poland)
Zagórzany, Świętokrzyskie Voivodeship (south-central Poland)

See also
Zagorzany